Scopula atriceps is a moth of the family Geometridae. It was described by George Hampson in 1895. It is found in Himachal Pradesh, India.

References

Moths described in 1895
atriceps
Moths of Asia
Taxa named by George Hampson